Cymatura itzingeri is a species of beetle in the family Cerambycidae. It was described by Stephan von Breuning in 1935. It is known from Tanzania and Malawi.

References

Xylorhizini
Beetles described in 1935